Robert William Marshall, Jr. (born June 17, 1959) is an American prelate of the Catholic Church who has been serving as Bishop of Alexandria in Louisiana since 2020.

Biography

Early life 
Robert Marshall was born on June 17, 1959, in Memphis, Tennessee.  He attended Christian Brothers High School in Memphis, then went to Christian Brothers University in Memphis, receiving a Bachelor of History degree in 1980. In 1983, Marshall earned a Juris Doctor degree at the University of Memphis law school. He then practiced law for twelve years in St. Louis, Missouri, and Memphis. Marshall entered Notre Dame Seminary in New Orleans in 1995 and completed his Master of Divinity degree in 2000.

Priesthood 
Marshall was ordained a priest of the Diocese of Memphis on June 10, 2000, by Bishop Terry Steib.  After his ordination, Marshall had the following pastoral assignments in Tennessee parishes{

 Incarnation in Collierville (2000-2002)
 Sacred Heart in Humboldt 
 St. Matthew in Milan (2002-2004)
 Ascension in Memphis (2004-2012)
 St. Francis of Assisi in Memphis (2012-2017)
 Cathedral of the Immaculate Conception in Memphis (2017-2020)

Marshall also served on the Presbyteral Council and the College of Consultors.  Marshall was the delegate of Archbishop Joseph Kurtz, who was apostolic administrator of the diocese from October 2018 to April 2019.  Marshall was appointed vicar general of the diocese in April 2019 by Bishop David P. Talley, the new bishop.

Bishop of Alexandria
Pope Francis appointed Marshall as bishop of the Diocese of Alexandria on April 21, 2020. He was consecrated by Archbishop Gregory  Aymond on August 20, 2020, at St. Francis Xavier Cathedral in Alexandria.

See also

 Catholic Church hierarchy
 Catholic Church in the United States
 Historical list of the Catholic bishops of the United States
 List of Catholic bishops of the United States
 Lists of patriarchs, archbishops, and bishops

References

External links
Roman Catholic Diocese of Alexandria Official Site

1959 births
Living people
People from Memphis, Tennessee
21st-century Roman Catholic bishops in the United States
Bishops appointed by Pope Francis